Ust-Yudoma (Uus Üdüme) is a rural locality (a selo), and one of two settlements in Ust-Maya Urban Okrug of Ust-Maysky District in the Sakha Republic, Russia, in addition to Ust-Maya, the administrative center of the Urban Okrug and the District, from which it is located  away. Its population as of the 2010 Census was 29, down from 49 recorded during the 2002 Census.

Climate
Ust-Yudoma has an extreme subarctic climate (Köppen climate classification: Dfd) with extremely cold winters and warm summers.

References

Notes

Sources
Official website of the Sakha Republic. Registry of the Administrative-Territorial Divisions of the Sakha Republic. Ust-Maysky District. 

Rural localities in Ust-Maysky District